There have been two baronetcies created for persons with the surname Burke, both in the Baronetage of Ireland. As of 2014 one creation is extant.

The Burke Baronetcy, of Glinsk in the County of Galway, was created in the Baronetage of Ireland on 2 August 1628 for Ulick Bourke. The third Baronet was a politician. The title became extinct on the death of the thirteenth Baronet in 1909. Two of his younger brothers both gained distinction. Thomas Henry Burke was Permanent Under-Secretary at the Irish Office for many years while Augustus Nicholas Burke was an artist.

The family seat was Glinsk Castle, near Ballymoe, County Galway.

The Burke Baronetcy, of Marble Hill in the County of Galway, was created in the Baronetage of Ireland on 5 December 1797 for Thomas Burke. He raised an infantry regiment at his own expense during the Napoleonic Wars. The second and third Baronets both sat as Members of Parliament for County Galway. The fifth Baronet served as High Sheriff of County Galway in 1883. The seventh Baronet was a deputy lieutenant of County Galway. Three other members of the family may also be mentioned. Charles Granby Burke (1814–1898), second son of the second Baronet, was Master of the Court of Common Pleas (Ireland) from 1852 to 1882. James Henry Burke (1816–1882), third son of the second Baronet, was a major-general in the Bombay Engineers. His son James Henry Thomas Joseph FitzGerald Burke (1853–1902) was a captain in the Royal Navy.

The family seat was Marble Hill House, near Loughrea, County Galway.

Burke baronets, of Glinsk (1628)

Sir Ulick Burke, 1st Baronet ( – c. 1660)
Sir Edmund Burke, 2nd Baronet (died c. 1686)
Sir Ulick Burke, 3rd Baronet (died 1708)
Sir John Burke, 4th Baronet (died c. 1724)
Sir Festus Burke, 5th Baronet (died c. 1730)
Sir Theobald Burke, 6th Baronet (died c. 1740)
Sir Henry Burke, 7th Baronet (died 1748)
Sir Ulick Burke, 8th Baronet (died 1759)
Sir Henry John Burke, 9th Baronet (died 1814)
Sir John Ignatius Burke, 10th Baronet (1784–1845)
Sir Joseph Burke, 11th Baronet (1786–1865)
Sir John Lionel Burke, 12th Baronet (1818–1884)
Sir Theobald Hubert Burke, 13th Baronet (1833–1909)

Burke baronets, of Marble Hill (1797)

Sir Thomas Burke, 1st Baronet (died 1813)
Sir John Burke, 2nd Baronet (1782–1847)
Sir Thomas John Burke, 3rd Baronet (1813–1875)
Sir John Charles Burke, 4th Baronet (1858–1880)
Sir Henry George Burke, 5th Baronet (1859–1910)
Sir Thomas Malachy Burke, 6th Baronet (1864–1913)
Sir Gerald Howe Burke, 7th Baronet (1893–1954)
Sir Thomas Stanley Burke, 8th Baronet (1916–1989)
Sir James Stanley Gilbert Burke, 9th Baronet (born 1956)

The heir apparent is the present holder's son Martin James Burke (born 1980).

See also
Nuala na Meadóige Ní Fionnachta
House of Burgh, an Anglo-Norman and Hiberno-Norman dynasty founded in 1193

Notes

References
Kidd, Charles, Williamson, David (editors). Debrett's Peerage and Baronetage (1990 edition). New York: St Martin's Press, 1990, 

Baronetcies in the Baronetage of Ireland
Extinct baronetcies in the Baronetage of Ireland
House of Burgh
1628 establishments in Ireland